Ted Nevill is a British author. He specializes in military history and has contributed to many books on military history. He currently resides in Beith, North Ayrshire where he is the director of the military history picture library, Cody Images. In 2008 Nevill was announced as the Scottish Conservative and Unionist Candidate in the Kilbirnie and Beith by-election.

Bibliography
 The Scottish Regiments Europa Militaria 1999 
 British Airborne Forces in the '90's Europa Militaria 1995 
 The Territorial Army, Ian Allan, 1989

External links
 Cody Images
 Image of Ted Nevill

1952 births
Living people
British military writers
Alumni of the University of Glasgow
People associated with North Ayrshire